The men's 82 kg sambo event at the 2019 European Games in Minsk was held on 22 June at the Minsk Sports Palace.

Results
Legend
 VH – Total victory – painful hold
 VT – Total victory – total throw

Repechage

References

External links
Draw Sheet

Men's 82 kg